The Palm Beach County Library System is the public library system of Palm Beach County, Florida. Its headquarters, the Main Library, is located in an unincorporated area near West Palm Beach, the county seat.
The system was established in 1967 and serves Palm Beach County through the Main Library and 17 branch libraries. Its first library branch opened in Tequesta on September 25, 1969 and its first bookmobile five days later. Unlike neighboring Broward and Miami-Dade counties, where most municipalities have joined their county's library system, most municipalities in Palm Beach County continue to operate their own city libraries, leading the county system to focus on the more suburban communities. Instead, a cooperative system model is in place to allow interoperation between county and municipal libraries.

Services

The Palm Beach County Library System provides a number of services to area patrons. The Adult Literacy Project provides those learning English as a second language with free, informal conversation sessions. Project members encourage community participation in the program, including educational materials, sponsors, tutors, student workshops and cultural events.

The Palm Beach County Library System provides on- and off-site story time service to local child centers, as well as workshops to assist teachers in storytelling techniques. The libraries within the Palm Beach County Library System also offer a social gathering venue and educational and craft programs for children and teens of various ages. These programs provide opportunities for individuals to discover new interests in a safe environment. These activities cover a large array of subjects such as Dungeons and Dragons, Teen Trivia, Anime classes and discussion groups, Teen Gaming, Poetry, and Harry Potter classes. The education-based programs are also meant to offer new skills, tutoring opportunities and teach safety skills. They also offer many online and technology-related classes for all ages. All the classes are focused towards specific age groups. Adults are also offered an array of programs for socializing, education, and entertaining. These classes focus on subjects such as practice of the English language, stress, Meditation, Yoga, crocheting, poetry, music and movie viewing. Some of these classes are focused on professional tasks such as taxes, résumé updates, new computer skills, online learning, and Medicare. The Palm Beach County Library System offers an Ask-a-Librarian service, where individuals are able to receive live reference service without entering a library building.

Each class is designed to meet the needs of local citizens within their area. Palm Beach County is large, and there are many libraries with different local demographics, so each one chooses the necessary programs to meet their patrons' needs. The library also offers Books-By-Mail, a Deaf Resource Center, and Talking Books services to those in special populations. Book Club in a Bag is another service offered which facilitates the selection of titles (English and Spanish) for local book club meetings. Multiple copies of the title and discussion notes are included, making it simple to start and maintain a book club. The Palm Beach County Library System also will help suggest reading materials. Through their "What to read next" page, a patron can access a variety of different websites and blogs, such as Novelist Plus, Library Reads, LibraryThing, and Goodreads, which will supply them with the information needed to find their new book. The library system also offers a Speakers Bureau, where library staff will visit civic organizations, homeowners associations and volunteer groups to give presentations on the services and opportunities available at the library.

Each library offers many different forms of media such as books, comics, DVDs, CDs, magazines, newspapers, digital eBooks, audiobooks and many other options. Physical media items can be requested from neighboring libraries and then delivered at a later date for pick up. Electronic and digital items can be located and downloaded from associated programs such as CloudLibrary and hoopla. These library items have the ability to be downloaded onto the patron's personal electronic devices for a preset amount of time. When their download has expired it will delete from their device.

The Palm Beach County Library System provides a number of special services, of which include: Government Research Service, Genealogy Research Service, Consumer Health Information Service and CreationStations. Government Research Services entails research, information, and document delivery services to government clients, staff, and elected officials in Palm Beach County. The GRS Collection includes legal documents, government serials, professional journals, and local and state collections. The Genealogy Research Service provides access to a wealth of family history sources including biographical books, genealogy Internet links, genealogy programs, how-to book listings, local city directories, local historical sites, newspapers, and journals. The Consumer Health Information Service offers quality health and medical information for free to residents of Palm Beach County. CreationStations are a digital media lab and recording studio where you can create multi-media content with Apple computers, video cameras, digital software, a photo scanner, sound recording and editing equipment, and a green screen. Special service items, including birding backpacks, mobile wifi-hotspots, civics & citizenship kits, and electronic document magnifiers are also provided at participating branches.

No More Late Fees 
On October 1, 2019 the Palm Beach County Library System stopped charging late fees. Instead of a late fee that adds a dime onto your account the library instead will offer a one week grace period after the due date before charging the full amount of the library material. If the fine totals more than $25 then the account will automatically be blocked however if the material is brought in the  fee is removed. The Palm Beach County Library System is one of many library systems in the United States to remove fines after several studies showed that fines have actually discouraged people to return to the library which often disproportionally affects low income families.

Branches 
The library system has seventeen branches located throughout Palm Beach County:

 Main Library in West Palm Beach
 Acreage Branch in Loxahatchee
 Belle Glade Branch in Belle Glade
 Canyon Branch in Boynton Beach, set to open in 2024
 Clarence E. Anthony Branch in South Bay
 Gardens Branch (formerly North County Regional) in Palm Beach Gardens
 Glades Road Branch (formerly South County Regional) in Boca Raton
 Greenacres Branch in Greenacres
 Hagen Ranch Road Branch in Delray Beach
 Jupiter Branch in Jupiter
 Lantana Road Branch in Lantana
 Loula V. York Branch in Pahokee
 Okeechobee Boulevard Branch in West Palm Beach
 Royal Palm Beach Branch in Royal Palm Beach
 Tequesta Branch in Tequesta
 Wellington Branch in Wellington
 West Boca Branch in Boca Raton
 West Boynton Branch in Boynton Beach

The Palm Beach County Bookmobile offers a selection of over 3,000 books. Including fiction and nonfiction in regular and large-print. Bookmobile staff help patrons with finding books and research questions. The Bookmobile stops at various Palm Beach County locations each week.

Funding
The Palm Beach County Library System takes a large percentage of its funding, roughly 85.2% as of 2016, from ad valorem property taxes collected by the county. This renders it less dependent upon outside grants (2.3% of funding as of 2016). It also receives support from a Friends of the Library organization, founded by Ingrid A. Eckler. An annual scholarship named after Eckler assists county library staff pursuing education in Library and Information Science.

The Palm Beach County Library Association is a professional organization that advocates for and supports libraries, librarians, and their advancement. It hosts a variety of events and fundraisers and supports the professional development of librarians and library science students with Professional Development Awards. Membership is not exclusive; it is open to students, librarians at all levels and areas, and supporters of libraries.

References 

County library systems in Florida
Education in Palm Beach County, Florida
West Palm Beach, Florida
1967 establishments in Florida